Idmon flavata is a butterfly in the family Hesperiidae. It was described by XL. Fan and M. Wang in 2007. It is found in China (Hainan).

References

Butterflies described in 2007
Ancistroidini